Our Mother of Perpetual Help (Latin: Nostra Mater de Perpetuo Succursu) (colloquially known as Our Lady of Perpetual Help) (1325—1480) is a Roman Catholic title of the Blessed Virgin Mary associated with a  15th-century Byzantine icon with an alleged  Marian apparition. The icon is believed to have originated from the Keras Kardiotissas Monastery and has been in Rome since 1499. Today it is permanently enshrined in the Church of Saint Alphonse of Liguori, where the official Novena to Our Mother of Perpetual Help text is prayed weekly.

Pope Pius IX granted a Pontifical decree of Canonical Coronation along with its official formalized title Nostra Mater de Perpetuo Succursu on 5 May 1866. The Latin Patriarch of Constantinople, Cardinal Ruggero Luigi Emidio Antici Mattei, executed the rite of coronation on 23 June 1867.

The Congregation of the Most Holy Redeemer serve as custodians of the icon. The image is sometimes known as “Virgin of the Passion of Jesus Christ” in the Eastern Orthodox religion. 

Novena devotions are held before June 27 every year. Under Pope Pius XII's Pontificate, the image was designated as the national Patroness of the Republic of Haiti and of Almoradí, in the Valencian Country, Spain.

Due to promotion by the Redemptorist Priests since 1865, the image has become very popular among Roman Catholics. Modern reproductions are oftentimes displayed in residential homes, commercial establishments, and public transportation.

Description 

The original wooden icon is suspended on the altar, measures 17" × 21" inches, and is written on hard nut wood with a gold leaf background. The image depicts the following symbols:
 The Blessed Virgin Mary — wearing a dress of dark red, in Byzantine iconography the color of the Empress.
 The subject shows Mary looking towards the faithful while pointing at her son, Jesus Christ who is frightened by the instruments of crucifixion and is depicted with a fallen sandal.
 The left side is Saint Michael Archangel —  carrying the lance and sponge of the crucifixion of Jesus.
 On the right side is Saint Gabriel Archangel carrying a 3-bar cross and nails.
 The Virgin Mary has a star on her forehead signifying her role as Star of the Sea while the cross on the side has been claimed as referring to the Greek monastery which produced the icon.

Byzantine depictions of the Blessed Virgin Mary in art have three stars, one star each on the shoulder and one on the forehead. This type of icon is called Hodegetria, where Mary is pointing to her Son, known as a Theotokos of the Passion.

Mary is depicted with a long slender nose, thin lips, and smoothly arched eyebrows, evidence of being made by a Greek artist. The veil and her face itself are rounded, indicating holiness. The size of the mother is also out of proportion to her son, a deliberate intent by the artist to show Mary as larger than life.

The Greek inscriptions read MP-ΘΥ (Μήτηρ Θεοῦ, Mother of God), ΟΑΜ (Ὁ Ἀρχάγγελος Μιχαήλ, Michael the Archangel), ΟΑΓ (Ὁ Ἀρχάγγελος Γαβριήλ, Gabriel the Archangel) and IC-XC (Ἰησοῦς Χριστός, Jesus Christ), respectively.

The icon has a gold ground on a walnut panel, believed to be from Crete. The Cretan School was the source of the many icons imported into Europe from the late Middle Ages through the Renaissance. The gold background represents the Kingdom of God. The round halo surrounding the Virgin Mary's head as well as details on the robes were created through Estofado, which is an artistic effect created by scraping the paint to reveal the gold background, additional effects are achieved by chasing designs on the gold. The icon was cleaned and restored once in 1866 and again in the year 1940.

Origin and discovery 

According to the Keras Kardiotissas Monastery, the icon was painted by Saint Lazarus Zographos and was known as the Panagia Kardiotissa (Παναγίας Καρδιώτισσας), due to the depiction of the Mother of God holding the Child Jesus near her heart. Historian Stergios Spanakis had argued that the miraculous icon was the reason for the founding of the monastery. Cristoforo Buondelmonti, an Italian Franciscan priest and traveler who visited Crete in 1415, wrote of the icon being miraculous:

The icon was stolen from the monastery in 1498.

The earliest written account of the icon after its abduction comes from a Latin and Italian plaque placed in the church of San Matteo in Via Merulana where it was first venerated by the public in 1499. The writer of the icon is unknown, but according to a parchment attached to the painting that accompanied the icon, it was stolen by a merchant sailing to Rome from the island of Crete. (The Keras Kardiotissas Monastery is regarded as the monastery from which the icon was stolen.) The image remained in the private possession of a Roman merchant and his family until 27 March 1499, when the icon was transferred to the church of San Matteo  where it remained for 300 years. The picture was then popularly called the “Madonna di San Matteo”. 

The Congregation of the Most Holy Redeemer maintain a robust account of the icon and its passage from the private hands of a merchant family in Rome to its final and current location at Sant'Alfonso di Liguori, on the Esquiline Hill in Rome. The accounting includes the story of a merchant who secured the icon from Crete, and brought it to his family's home in Rome, during the late 15th century. The story includes a passage of a young member of the family, the six-year-old daughter of the merchant, who was visited by the Virgin Mary in a dream. Part of the accounting includes the following passage:

The icon remained at Saint Matthew's for three centuries. For at least the final 60 years of the 18th century, St. Matthew's was occupied by the Augustinian Order of the Catholic Church. When war broke out in Rome in 1798, the icon was moved to the Church of Saint Mary in Posterula, near the "Umberto I" bridge that crosses the Tiber River in Rome. The icon remained "hidden" there until Pope Pius IX granted the possession of the icon to the Redemptorists by Papal Edict, in 1865. The Church of Saint Mary in Posterula was later demolished in 1880.

According to the account by the Redemptorists: "In January 1866, Fathers Michael Marchi and Ernest Bresciani went to Saint Mary's in Posterula to receive the picture from the Augustinians.". The Redemptorists had purchased the property where the former Saint Matthew's had stood, and had established and built the modern Sant'Alfonso di Liguori, in honor of the founder of their congregation. Thus, the venerated icon of the Catholic Church was returned to the location described by the Virgin Mary in the dream of the merchant's daughter, that is, at the church between Saint Mary Major and Saint John Lateran.

Redemptorist tradition holds that Pope Pius IX declared, in 1866, that the Redemptorists make the icon known to the world, and so, several copies were made and sent to Redemptorist parishes around the world. One such Redemptorist parish in the United States, Saint Mary's in Annapolis, Maryland, received a copy from Rome in 1868. The image is prominently displayed within the sanctuary of the parish.

Transfer 
In 1798, French troops under Louis-Alexandre Berthier occupied Rome as part of the French Revolutionary Wars, establishing the
short-lived Roman Republic and taking Pope Pius VI prisoner. Among the several churches demolished during the French occupation was San Matteo in Via Merulana, which housed the icon. The Augustinian friars who rescued the icon first took it to the nearby Church of St. Eusebius, then later set it up on a side altar in the Church of Santa Maria in Posterula.

In January 1855, the Redemptorist priests purchased Villa Caserta in Rome along the Via Merulana and converted it into their headquarters. Decades later, Pope Pius IX invited the Redemptorist Fathers to set up a Marian house of veneration in Rome, in response to which the Redemptorists built Sant'Alfonso di Liguori at that location. The Redemptorists were thus established on the Via Merulana, not knowing that it had once been the site of the Church of San Matteo and shrine of the once-famous icon.

Custodianship 

Pope Pius IX sent a letter on 11 December 1865 to Father General Mauron, C.Ss.R., ordered that the image be once again publicly venerated in Via Merulana, the new church of Saint Alphonsus. The same Pontiff directed the Augustinian friars to surrender the original icon to the Redemptorist priests, on condition that the Redemptorists must supply the Augustinian priests with another adequate picture in exchange as a gesture of goodwill.

The instructions of the Pontifical order to the Redemptorists were:

Upon its official transfer, Pope Pius IX finally gave his Apostolic Blessing and titled the icon Mater de Perpetuo Succursu (English: Mother of Perpetual Succour). 

On 21 April 1866, the Redemptorist Superior General gave one of the first copies of the icon to Pope Pius IX. This copy is preserved in the chapel of the Redemptorists' Generalate in Rome. 

On 5 May 1866, the image was granted a decree of  Canonical Coronation by the Dean of the Vatican Chapter in a solemn and official recognition of the Marian icon under that title. The Latin Patriarch of Constantinople, Cardinal Ruggero Luigi Emidio Antici Mattei, executed the rite of coronation on 23 June 1867.

The original icon remains under the care of the Redemptorist Fathers at the Church of St. Alphonsus with the latest restoration of the icon having taken place in 1990.

Restoration and Carbon dating 

In 1866, the icon underwent restoration by the Polish painter Leopold Nowotny (1822—1870).

In 1990, the icon was taken down from its altar for new photography and image restoration commissioned by the General Government of Redemptorists. The Redemptorist Order entered into contract with the Technical Department at the Vatican Museum to restore the icon and prevent further fungal damage to the icon. The restoration process involved X-ray, infrared scanning, technical analysis of the paint and ultra-violet testing along with a Carbon-14-test which placed the icon between the year 1325–1480. Artistic analysis of the icon revealed that the facial structure of the icon was altered due to previous overpainting, resulting in a combination of "oriental and occidental" features of the image.

Pontifical approbations
 Pope Pius IX granted a Pontifical decree of Canonical Coronation to the original image along with its present title on 5 May 1866. The Latin Patriarch of Constantinople, Cardinal Ruggero Luigi Emidio Antici Mattei, executed the rite of coronation on 23 June 1867.
 Pope Pius XII decreed this Marian title the Patroness of Haiti (1942) and Almoradi, Spain (1945). 
 Pope John Paul II granted a canonical coronation for the following venerated images: 
 In Podgórze, Poland authorized by decree signed on 14 May 1994. The rite of coronation was executed in 26 June 1994.  
 The venerated icon in Wadowice, the birthplace of the pope, was crowned by his decree on 16 June 1999. 
Pope Francis granted a Pontifical decree of coronation for the namesake image venerated in the monastery of the Redemptorist Order in  Gliwice on 22 June 2014.

Marian cult and veneration 
Our Lady of Perpetual Help has been venerated across many cultures and thus bears several titles in different languages, such as Mother of Perpetual Succour, Unsere Liebe Frau von der immerwährenden Hilfe, Nuestra Señora del Perpetuo Socorro, Notre-Dame du Perpétuel Secours, Mater del Perpetuo Succursu, and Yna ng Laging Saklolo.

India 

On 8 September 1948, the Perpetual Succour Novena was started in a small way at St. Michael's Church, Mumbai at Mahim in the city of Mumbai, India. It all began in 1948 when Father Edward Fernandes, who, on his return from Europe, having seen the devotion to Our Lady of Perpetual Succour at Belfast in Ireland, brought back with him a picture – one blessed by placing it upon the original picture in Rome. The devotion spread fast and wide due to his evangelization efforts.  Father Edward Fernandes was transferred from Mahim in June 1950. Today, from 6 in the morning to 10 at night, streams of devotees pour in for 12 services held in English, Konkani, Marathi, Hindi and Tamil. These multi-lingual services testify to the immense popularity of the devotion. In fact, numerous parishes across the city such as Our Lady of Egypt have adopted this novena for the convenience of their parishioners. Today, seven decades later, the devotion continues at Saint Michael of Mahim Church.

The Philippines 
Our Lady of Perpetual Help is widely venerated by Filipino Catholics and Overseas Filipino communities. A German copy of the icon is venerated in the National Shrine of Our Mother of Perpetual Help in Baclaran, Parañaque City, Metro Manila – the country's centre of devotion to the icon. Since 1958, the Church has been authorized to remain open 24 hours a day.   Pope John Paul II once offered a Catholic Mass at the shrine as cardinal, and later prayed before the icon during his first pastoral visit to the country in February 1981.

The veneration of this icon is culturally unique to Philippine religiosity due to the absolute fact that all Catholic churches and petite chapels in the Philippines have a replica of the icon, often enshrined in a side altar. Similar to the archetype of the Last Supper in a Filipino dining room, this enshrinement has been a culture phenomenon unique to all Filipino Catholic shrines and churches, even sometimes caricatured as a cultural satire. The areas enshrined in this icon are either found in the foyer entrance of a church, a side altar or a freestanding chapel in a larger sized church.  Copies of the icon can also be found in countless houses, businesses, and even public utility vehicles.

Every Wednesday, many congregations hold services where they publicly recite the rosary and the icon's associated novena, along with a priest delivering Benediction and celebrating a votive Mass in its honor. Devotees today still use the same Novena booklet first published by Irish Redemptorists, who introduced the icon and its devotion to the Philippines in the early 1900s. The Filipino Diaspora continue keeping the Wednesday Novena, holding novena services in their respective parishes overseas.

In Saint John the Baptist Parish, Garcia Hernandez, Bohol, the feast of the image is held on April 27 instead of the usual liturgical date. The 48 sub-chapels in the parish participate in the annual feast, while every 27th month has each chapel's respective congregations holding a procession of the icon. This form of devotion began in 1923 when two missionary priests, a Dutchman named Thomas and a German named Jorge, brought the icon to the town. The original icon can still be seen in a chapel of the parish; its reverse bears a Latin inscription attesting to its dedication.

In the Nueva Ecija province, Our Lady of Perpetual Help is widely venerated. Yearly, a first-class relic is exposed to the faithful from June 18 until June 27.

United States 
In 1878, the Basilica and Shrine of Our Lady of Perpetual Help in Boston, Massachusetts, obtained a certified copy of the icon being the first in the United States. Between 1927 and 1935, the first American novena service dedicated to the icon was recited in Saint Alphonsus "The Rock" church in St. Louis, Missouri, and various other Redemptorist stations around the United States.

There is a shrine Church of the Most Holy Redeemer in Manhattan; and at the Basilica of Our Lady of Perpetual Help (Brooklyn) and Ybor City, Tampa, Florida.

Patronage 
The town of Almoradí in the Valencian Country of Spain invokes the patronage of Our Mother of Perpetual Help. In 1918, the son of the Marquis of Ríoflorido, José Carlos, fell ill with pleurisy. His mother, Lady Desamparado Fontes, fed him a silk fabric cloth touched to the icon of Perpetual Help in Rome, which resulted in instantaneous healing later claimed to be miraculous. As a token of thanksgiving, Fontes officially donated funds to begin the Confraternity of Almoradí. On 29 May 1919, Our Lady of Perpetual Help was officially enthroned in Saint Andrew's Parish as the official patroness of the town. In 1945, Pope Pius XII confirmed this patronage by a pontifical decree. On its 50th anniversary in 1969, a public diocesan coronation of this image was held, directed by the town mayor and its authorities, with the crowns made by Santero artist José David.

Our Lady of Perpetual Help is also the principal patroness of Haiti. According to Roman Catholic bishop Guy Sansaricq, former Haitian president Élie Lescot and his cabinet petitioned the Holy See to make Our Mother of Perpetual Help the Patroness of Haiti in 1942. Many Haitians credit the Virgin Mary under this title with performing miracles to prevent a smallpox outbreak which ravaged the country in 1882. The Holy See approved the request for patronage under the Pontificate of Pope Pius XII. Our Lady of Perpetual Help is also present in numerous Haitian public stamps used by the Office des Postes d'Haiti. In January 2010, Pope Benedict XVI invoked Our Lady of Perpetual Help for Haiti's earthquake relief through Archbishop Louis Kébreau.

Our Lady of Perpetual Help is also the patroness of the Diocese of Salina, Kansas in the United States, of the Diocese of Middlesbrough & the Roman Catholic Diocese of Leeds in England, and of the Catholic Diocese of Issele-Uku in Nigeria.

See also 
 Virgin of Mercy
 Titles of Mary

Notes

References

Citations

Sources

Further reading 
 Ferrero, Fabriciano. The Story of an Icon: The Full History, Tradition and Spirituality of the Popular Icon of Our Mother .., of Perpetual Help. Redemptorist Publications, 2001. .
 Milliner, Matthew, Mother of the Lamb: The Story of a Gloabal Icon, Fortress Press, 2022.  .

External links 
 

Titles of Mary
Byzantine art
Paintings of the Virgin Mary
Perpetual Help